This is a list of Zob Ahan F.C.'s results at the 2009–10 Persian Gulf Cup, 2009–10 Hazfi Cup and 2010 ACL. The club is competing in the Iran Pro League, Hazfi Cup and Asian Champions League.

Persian Gulf Cup

Matches 

Last updated 19 May 2010

Results by round

Results summary

League standings

Top scorers and assists

Goal scorers 
11 Goals
  Mohammad Reza Khalatbari

7 Goals
  Seyed Mohammad Hosseini

6 Goals
  Esmaeil Farhadi

5 Goals
  Igor Castro

4 Goals
  Farshid Talebi

3 Goals
  Ghasem Hadadifar
  Mohammad Ghazi

2 Goals
  Mohsen Mosalman

1 Goal
  Sina Ashouri
  Keivan Amraei
  Mostafa Salehi Nejad
  Mohammad Mansouri
  Mohammad Salsali
  Payam Sadeghian

Assists 
8 Assists
  Hassan Ashjari

7 Assists
  Mohammad Mansouri

6 Assists
  Esmaeil Farhadi

5 Assists
  Mohammad Reza Khalatbari

2 Assists
  Mohammad Ghazi

1 Assist
  Seyed Mohammad Hosseini
  Farshid Talebi
  Ghasem Hadadifar
  Mohsen Mosalman
  Mostafa Salehi Nejad
  Abbas Ghasemi
  Igor Castro

Cards

Matches played 
28 Matches
  Seyed Mohammad Hosseini

27 Matches
  Hassan Ashjari
  Shahab Gordan

26 Matches
  Mohammad Salsali

Hazfi Cup

Matches 
Last updated 13 April 2010

Statistics

Goalscorers 
4 Goals
  Mohammad Ghazi

1 Goal
  Mohammad Reza Khalatbari
  Mohammad Mansouri
  Seyed Mohammad Hosseini
  Igor Castro

Goalassistants 

2 Assists
  Ghasem Hadadifar

1 Assist
  Babak Razi
  Mohammad Salsali
  Mohammad Ghazi

Cards

Asian Champions League

Group B

Matches

Group stage

Round of 16

Quarter-finals

Top scorers and assists

Goal scorers 
3 Goals
  Mohammad Reza Khalatbari

2 Goals
  Mohammad Ghazi
  Igor Castro

1 Goal
  Seyed Mohammad Hosseini
  Esmaeil Farhadi

Assists 
2 Assists
  Hassan Ashjari

1 Assist
  Farshid Talebi
  Ghasem Hadadifar
  Mohammad Ghazi

Cards

References

External links
Iran Premier League Statistics
Persian League
Soccerway

Zob Ahan Esfahan F.C. seasons
Zob Ahan